Washington Township is one of the nine townships of Marion County, Indiana, located in the northern part of the county. The township is entirely within the city of Indianapolis. The population as of the 2010 census was 132,049. The first settlement at Washington Township was made in 1819.

On January 1, 2007, the Washington Township Fire Department became the first township fire department in Marion County to consolidate into the Indianapolis Fire Department as part of Indianapolis Mayor Bart Peterson's proposed Indy Works government cost-savings plan, even though Indy Works, which included merging of Marion County fire departments as part of its cost saving efforts, failed to pass in the City-County Council.

Geography

Municipalities 
 Crows Nest
 Indianapolis (partial)
 Meridian Hills
 North Crows Nest
 Rocky Ripple
 Spring Hill
 Williams Creek
 Wynnedale

Communities 
 Broad Ripple Village
 Butler-Tarkington
 Glendale
 Mapleton-Fall Creek
 Meridian-Kessler
 Nora
 Ravenswood

References

External links
 Indiana Township Association
 United Township Association of Indiana

Townships in Marion County, Indiana
Geography of Indianapolis
Townships in Indiana